This is a list of nationalist organizations. Clarification of which sort of nationalism is given after some entries. This list does not include governments and formal armies.

Africa

Egypt 

Union of State Supporters- nationalist group

Ethiopia 

 Oromo Liberation Front – ethnic nationalism 
 Ogaden National Liberation Front – ethnic nationalism 
 National Movement of Amhara – ethnic nationalism 
 Sidama Liberation Front – ethnic nationalism 
 Amhara Democratic Party – ethnic nationalism 
 Oromo Democratic Party – ethnic nationalism 
 Afar National Democratic Party – ethnic nationalism 
 Benishangul-Gumuz People's Democratic Unity Front – ethnic nationalism 
 Ethiopian Somali People's Democratic Party – ethnic nationalism 
 Gambela People's Democratic Movement – ethnic nationalism 
 Hareri National League – ethnic nationalism 
 Tigray People's Liberation Front – ethnic nationalism 
 Argoba Nationality Democratic Organization – ethnic nationalism 
 Oromo Federalist Democratic Movement – ethnic nationalism

South Africa 

National Party – White nationalist
Pan Africanist Congress – Black nationalist, liberation movement
AWB – White nationalist
Freedom Front Plus – moderate, Afrikaner nationalist and separatist
Inkatha Freedom Party – populist, Zulu nationalist and conservative
Blanke Bevrydingsbeweging (English: White Liberation Movement) (BBB) – The BBB sought a white South Africa by the removal of the black population.
Herstigte Nasionale Party (English: Reconstituted National Party) – A far-right wing party supporting Afrikaner nationalism and a return to apartheid.
South African Gentile National Socialist Movement

Zimbabwe 

ZANU–PF

Europe

Albania 
Democratic Party of Albania - centre-right nationalist political party
Party for Justice, Integration and Unity - right-wing, ethnic nationalist political party
Red and Black Alliance - right-wing, ethnic nationalist political party
Albanian Fascist Party
Albanian National Front Party - nationalist political party with branches in North Macedonia and Kosovo
Democratic National Front Party
Movement for United Albania - irredentist and nationalist political movement
National Unity Party - ultra-nationalist political party, supports a pan-Albanian confederation
Natural Albania - pacifist, nationalist political party supporting Greater Albania and union with Kosovo

Armenia 
Adequate Party – far-right, nationalist political party
Sasna Tsrer Pan-Armenian Party – right-wing, nationalist political party

Austria 

Austrian Freedom Party – right-wing to far-right, classical liberal, Pan-German nationalist, anti-immigration

Belgium

Nationwide
National Front
Bloed, Bodem, Eer en Trouw
Parti Communautaire National-Européen
Parti Communautaire Européen
Racial Volunteer Force

Flanders
New Flemish Alliance – Flemish nationalist, centre-right
Vlaams Belang – Flemish nationalist, right-wing to far-right
Spirit – liberal Flemish nationalistic
Order of Flemish Militants – Flemish nationalist, far-right

Wallonia
Rassemblement Wallonie France – Walloon secessionist, aiming to unite French-speaking Belgians with France

Bosnia and Herzegovina

Bosnian
Bosnian Movement of National Pride - far-right Bosnian nationalist political organization
Bosnian-Herzegovinian Patriotic Party -  Bosnian nationalist centre-right political party
Independent Bloc - Bosnian nationalist conservative centrist political party 
Movement of Democratic Action - Bosnian nationalist conservative regionalist political party 
Party for Bosnia and Herzegovina - Bosnian nationalist centralist political party 
Party of Democratic Activity - Bosnian nationalist conservative political party

Croatian
Croat People's Union - former Croatian nationalist, conservative political party favouring decentralization
Croatian Coalition - Croatian nationalist, right-wing, favouring decentralization, former coalition of Croatian Democratic Union 1990 and Croatian Party of Rights of Bosnia and Herzegovina
Croatian Democratic Union 1990 -  Croatian nationalist, conservative, federalist centre-right political party
Croatian Democratic Union of Bosnia and Herzegovina - Croatian nationalist, conservative, federalist, Christian democratic political party
Croatian National Assembly - federalist political organisation of Croat political parties in Bosnia and Herzegovina
Croatian Party of Rights of Bosnia and Herzegovina - Croatian nationalist far-right political party
Croatian Peasant Party of Bosnia and Herzegovina - Christian democratic, agrarian, Croatian nationalist, federalist, centrist political party
Party of Croatian Right - Croatian nationalist, conservative, eurosceptic right-wing political party
Party of Rights of Bosnia and Herzegovina 1861 - a pendant of the Croatian Party of Rights 1861 in Croatia, Croatian nationalist, conservative, eurosceptic right-wing political party

Serbian
Serbian Radical Party "9th January" - Serbian nationalist far-right party in Republika Srpska
Serbian Radical Party of Republika Srpska -  Serbian nationalist centre-right political party in Republika Srpska
Alliance of Independent Social Democrats - Serbian left-wing nationalist and separatist political party
Democratic People's Alliance - regionalist, national conservative, Serbian nationalist centre-right political party
Party of Democratic Progress - national conservative, Serbian nationalist centre-right political party
Serb Democratic Party - Serbian right-wing nationalist and separatist political party
United Srpska - Serbian nationalist political party in Republika Srpska

Croatia 

Croatian Pure Party of Rights -  far-right political party

Cyprus 

EOKA - a defunct a Greek Cypriot nationalist guerrilla organisation that fought a campaign for the end of British rule in Cyprus, for the island's self-determination and for eventual union with Greece
EOKA-B - defunct Greek Cypriot paramilitary organisation
TMT - Turkish Cypriot pro-taksim paramilitary organisation
Union of Cypriots - Cypriot nationalist (left-wing)

Denmark 
Bornholm's Self-Government Party - Bornholm separatism

Estonia 

Vaps Movement – historic
Estonian Independence Party – ethnic
Conservative People's Party of Estonia – ethnic nationalist, traditionalist party
Sinine Äratus – nationalist youth organization linked with Identitarian movement

Finland 

Perussuomalaiset
Suomen Sisu
Blue and White Front
Pohjoismainen Vastarintaliike – (Nordic Resistance Movement)

France

National
Action Française – integralist and monarchist
Croix de Feu – far-right
National Rally – support of Jus sanguinis and return to traditional values
Debout la France – eurosceptic, national-conservative and souverainist
The Patriots – eurosceptic, right-wing populist and souverainist
Party of France
Renouveau français
Identity Bloc
Unité Radicale
Fédération d'action nationale et européenne
Jeunesses Patriotes
Groupe Union Défense
Third Way
Nouvelle Résistance
Revolutionary Nationalist Groups
Party of New Forces

Breton
Adsav – Breton nationalist secessionist party
Party for the Organization of a Free Brittany 
Unvaniezh Demokratel Breizh - left-wing Breton nationalist, autonomist, and regionalist political party
Breton Autonomist Party
Breton Communist Party
Breton Federalist League
Breton National Party
Breton Nationalist Party
Breton Party
Breton Social-National Workers' Movement
Emgann
Young Bretons Movement/Ar Vretoned Yaouank

Corsican
Armata Corsa - an underground separatist terrorist organization in Corsica, today disbanded
Corsica Nazione – Corsican nationalist party
Corsican Nationalist Alliance - political party endorsing Corsican nationalism
Corsican Workers' Trade Union - nationalist labour union
National Liberation Front of Corsica - secessionist militant group
Party of the Corsican Nation - Corsican nationalist and autonomist political party
Pè a Corsica - Corsican nationalist political party
Union of the Corsican People - defunct Corsican nationalist political favouring self-government and pacifism
Unione Naziunale - Corsican nationalist group of secessionist political parties

Georgia 
Conservative Party of Georgia - Centre-right and nationalist political party
Free Georgia -  centre-left nationalist political party
Georgian March - far-right nationalist Organization
Georgian Troupe - Left-wing nationalist political party

Germany 
Alternative for Germany (AfD) – right-wing to far-right 
National Democratic Party of Germany – far-right, ethnic
German People's Union – ethnic
National Socialist German Workers Party (Nazi Party) – far-right, ethnic

Greece 

Golden Dawn – far-right, Greek ultranationalist party and convicted criminal organization
Greeks for the Fatherland - a successor of Golden Dawn
National Popular Consciousness - a successor of Golden Dawn
Greek National Socialist Party
National Union of Greece
4th of August Party
Front Line
New Right
Independent Greeks
Popular Orthodox Rally

Hungary 
Fidesz – Right-wing national conservative political party
Jobbik – Conservative and radically patriotic Christian party
Hungarian Justice and Life Party – Nationalist political party
Sixty-Four Counties Youth Movement - Far-right movement
Force and Determination – Far-right Hungarian nationalist political movement
Our Homeland Movement – Far-right political party

Ireland 

Young Irelanders 
Fenian Brotherhood
Irish Republican Army – historic organisation, led the independence war
Provisional Irish Republican Army – modern organisation, led a campaign during The Troubles 1969–1998
Continuity Irish Republican Army and Real Irish Republican Army – small splinter groups, opposed to the peace process
Sinn Féin – republican, left-wing
Social Democratic and Labour Party – Northern Ireland based, moderate
Irish Parliamentary Party – 19th century, pro home rule
National Party – nationalist, right-wing

Italy 

Brothers of Italy-National Alliance – support of Jus sanguinis and national conservatism
CasaPound – far-right neo-fascist
New Force – ultranationalism
The Right – right-wing
Tricolour Flame – far-right
Italian Social Movement – right-wing to far-right, from 1946 to 1995
National Fascist Party – historic, ruled Italy from 1922 to 1943
Republican Fascist Party
Fascism and Freedom Movement – far-right, neo-fascist and anti-zionist, split from Italian Social Movement

Kosovo

Albanian
Albanian Alliance
Albanian National Front Party - nationalist political party branch of the main party in Albania
Albanian Christian Democratic Party of Kosovo
Alliance for the Future of Kosovo
National Movement for the Liberation of Kosovo
People's Movement of Kosovo
Movement for Integration and Unification - irredentist movement
Movement for Unification
Social Democratic Initiative
Vetëvendosje

Serbian
Independent Liberal Party
New Democracy
Progressive Democratic Party (Kosovo)
Serb Civic Initiative
Serb Kosovo-Metohija Party
Serb List
Serb People's Party
Serbian List for Kosovo and Metohija
Serbian National Council of Kosovo and Metohija
Union of Independent Social Democrats of Kosovo and Metohija

Latvia 
Visu Latvijai (All for Latvia) – nationalist party
National Alliance – national-conservative and populist

Montenegro 
Party of Serb Radicals - Serbian far-right nationalist political party

Netherlands 
 Party for Freedom
 Forum for Democracy
 Dutch People's Union

North Macedonia

Albanian
Albanian National Front Party - nationalist political party branch of the main party in Albania
Alliance for Albanians
Democratic Party of Albanians

Macedonian
VMRO-DPMNE,  Christian democratic, nationalist political party
United for Macedonia - right wing conservative-nationalist political party

Norway 

Nasjonal Samling (National Gathering) – fascist
Norges Nasjonalsosialistiske Bevegelse (National Socialist Movement of Norway)
Vigrid
Heathen Front

Poland 
National Radical Camp
All-Polish Youth
National Movement - main national democratic political party strongly working with the All-Polish Youth (part of the Confederation)
League of Polish Families - national democratic political party
National Revival of Poland - national radical political party (working with National Radical Camp)
Falanga - illegal and unregistered national radical organization considered to be terrorist
National Guard
Roty Niepodległości (official website)
Independence March Association (official website)
Third Way 
Camp of Great Poland

Portugal 
National Renovator Party - far-right nationalist party 
New Social Order - neo-fascist political movement

Romania 
Noua Dreaptă - Far-right 
Everything For the Country Party - Neo-Legionarism
Greater Romania Party – Nationalism
United Romania Party – Nationalism

Russia
United Russia - Right-wing
Liberal Democratic Party of Russia - Far-right

Serbia 

Serbian Radical Party
Dveri
Obraz
Serbian Action

Slovakia 

Slovenská národná strana – nationalist, right-wing
We Are Family – nationalist and conservative, centre-right to right-wing
Kotleba – People's Party Our Slovakia – far-right ultranationalist party, regarded as neo-fascist or neo-Nazi

Spain

Nationwide
Falange – fascist
National Democracy – far-right ultranationalist
National Alliance – far-right and neo-Nazi
Vox - far-right political party
Spanish Alternative
España 2000
Republican Social Movement – third-positionist political party
European Nation State – European nationalist political party of Spain.
Bases Autónomas – violent neo-nazi group that was active in Spain in the 80's and 90's.
CEDADE – national-socialist cultural and political association, founded in 1966 and dissolved in 1993.

Asturias 

Conceyu Nacionalista Astur – left-wing (Marxist, socialist and anarchist) independentist (defunct)
Movimiento Comunista d'Asturies – Maoist party in favour of the self-determination (defunct)
Unidá Nacionalista Asturiana – left-wing independentist (refounded in 2007)
Andecha Astur – left-wing independentist
Andecha Obrera – far left-wing independentist armed group in the 1980s (not to be confused with "Andecha Astur")

Basque Country 

Amaiur – left-wing independentist party
Basque Nationalist Party, Christian-Democrat political party
Basque National Liberation Movement – virtual union between left-wing independentist parties, youths
Batasuna – left-wing independentist (banned in Spain, not in France, see Abertzaleen Batasuna)
EH Bildu – left-wing independentist party 
ETA – Marxist–Leninist armed group active from the 1960s to 2018.
Haika, Segi and Jarrai – left-wing independentist youth organizations (banned in Spain)
Langile Abertzaleen Batzordeak – left-wing independentist workers union

Canary Islands
Canary Islands Independence Movement - defunct Canarian nationalist independentist organization
National Congress of the Canaries -  separatist political party
Popular Front of the Canary Islands - Canarian nationalist independentist leftist political party
Azarug
Canarian Assembly
Canarian Coalition
Canarian Convergence
Canarian Independent Groups
Canarian Nationalist Alternative
Canarian Nationalist Left
Canarian Nationalist Party
Canarian People's Union
Canarian Popular Alternative
Communist Cells
Provisional Communist Party of the Canary Islands
Independent Herrenian Group
Inekaren
Nationalist Canarian Assembly
Nationalist Canarian Initiative
Party of Communist Unification in the Canaries
Tenerife Group of Independents
United Canarian People
Unity of the People
We Are Lanzarote - left-wing Canarian and ecologist political party based on the island of Lanzarote

Catalonia 

Catalan European Democratic Party (PDECAT) - right-wing pro-independence party. 
Democratic Convergence of Catalonia - right-wing pro-independence party refounded as PDECAT.
Esquerra Republicana de Catalunya (ERC) – left-wing independentist party.
Òmnium Cultural - nationalist pro-independence cultural association
Platform for Catalonia – Far-right xenophobic and Spanish unionist organization.
PSAN – communist independentist party
Popular Unity Candidature (CUP) - far-left pro-independence party.
Terra Lliure – left-wing independentist armed group

Galicia 
Galician Nationalist Bloc – left-wing independentist party

Sweden 
Nordic Resistance Movement
National Socialist Front a former Neo-Nazi political party.
Party of the Swedes – White nationalist
Sweden Democrats – social conservative with a nationalist foundation, but has been characterised by others as far-right, right-wing populist, national-conservative, and anti-immigration.
The Nordic Realm Party
Alternative for Sweden

Switzerland
Campaign for an Independent and Neutral Switzerland – Pro-Swiss neutrality and independence
Swiss People's Party
Freedom Party of Switzerland
National Front
Party of Farmers, Traders and Independents
Swiss Nationalist Party

Turkey

Nationwide
Grey Wolves – ultra-nationalist organisation
Ergenekon – allegedly clandestine, secularist ultra-nationalist organization
Victory Party (Turkey) – Turkish nationalism, Kemalist and anti-immigration
Turkish Revenge Brigade
Nationalist Movement Party
Good Party – Kemalist and nationalist
Great Union Party – Islamist and ultra-nationalist
Rights and Equality Party – Kemalist and nationalist
Nationalist and Conservative Party
Independent Turkey Party
Nation Party
National Party
People's Ascent Party – Kemalist, centrist, social democratic and nationalist political party
Homeland Party – right-wing, nationalist and conservative, political party

Ukraine 

Organization of Ukrainian Nationalists
Tryzub (organization)
Congress of Ukrainian Nationalists
Svoboda – right-wing to far-right Ukrainian nationalist political party
Right Sector
Azov Battalion
Patriots of Ukraine
Social-National Party of Ukraine
Social-National Assembly

United Kingdom

Union-wide
British National Party – fascist, far-right
National Front – far-right
British Union of Fascists – fascist, defunct
Britain First – far-right
League of Empire Loyalists – far-right, imperialist, defunct
National Action – neo-Nazi, youth organisation, proscribed
UK Independence Party – Right-wing to far-right

Cornwall
Mebyon Kernow – centre-left, social democratic, civic nationalism
Cornish Nationalist Party – centre-right, Pan-Celticism

England
English Democrats – in favour of English parliament and autonomy within the UK
English independence – a political stance in favour of English independence from the UK

Northern Ireland
Ulster Volunteer Force – loyalist, sectarian
Ulster Defence Association – loyalist, sectarian
Ulster Protestant Volunteers – loyalist, sectarian, populist
Loyalist Volunteer Force – loyalist, fundamentalist, sectarian

Scotland 

Scottish National Party – centre-left, separatist, civic nationalism
Grand Orange Lodge of Scotland – loyalist, sectarian

Wales 

Plaid Cymru – progressive, separatist, civic nationalism
Free Wales Army – nationalist paramilitary
Mudiad Amddiffyn Cymru- nationalist paramilitary

Asia

Afghanistan 

 National Islamic Movement of Afghanistan
 National Islamic Unity Party of Afghanistan
 National and Islamic Prosperity Party of Afghanistan
 National and Islamic Moderate Party of Afghanistan
 Solidarity Party of Afghanistan

Bangladesh 

Bangladesh Nationalist Party

China 

Kuomintang
Young China Party
Chinese Communist Party

India 
Bharatiya Janata Party  
Shiv Sena
Sangh Parivar

Iran 

Aria Party
Azure Party
Freedom Movement of Iran
Nation Party of Iran
National Front of Iran
Nationalist-Religious movement
Pan-Iranist Party
SUMKA

Iraq and Syria 

Ba'ath Party – secular pan-arabism
Syrian Social Nationalist Party

Israel 
Zehut- Libertarian nationalist
Israel Beytenu- Populist & nationalist
Likud – national-liberal and revisionist Zionist
The Jewish Home – religious-nationalist and religious Zionist
Kach Party -Ultranationalist party of the following political ideology: Religious Zionism, Halachic state, Kahanism, Religious conservatism, Population transfer, Economic liberalism, Anti-communism, Anti-Arabism, Anti-Islam, Ultranationalism

Japan

Nationwide 
Liberal Democratic Party (Japan) - Japanese nationalist, conservative
Nippon Kaigi - Japanese nationalist, Religious right

local 
Nippon Ishin no Kai - Japanese nationalist, conservative
Okinawa Social Mass Party - Left-wing nationalist, Okinawa regionalism

Korea

North Korea 

 Workers' Party of Korea

South Korea 
 United Future Party – Right-wing nationalist, anti-communist
 Future Korea Party – Right-wing nationalist, anti-communist
 Democratic Party of Korea – Liberal nationalist and Korean nationalist
 Minjung Party – Left-wing nationalist, Anti-imperialism

Nepal 

 Rastriya Prajatantra Party
 Rastriya Prajatantra Party Nepal
 Hindu Prajatantrik Party
 GFP Ramdir Sena

Lebanon 

Guardians of the Cedars
Kataeb Party
Lebanese Forces Party

Pakistan

Nationwide
Pakistan Muslim League (Z) – far-right nationalist
Muttahida Majlis-e-Amal – right-wing to far-right, religious nationalist

Muhajir 

 Muttahida Qaumi Movement – London
 Mohajir Qaumi Movement Pakistan
 Muttahida Qaumi Movement – Pakistan

Balochistan 

Balochistan Liberation Army
Balochistan Liberation Front/Baluchi Liberation Front
Baluch People's Liberation Front
Popular Front for Armed Resistance
Baluchi Autonomist Movement

Pashtunistan 
Qaumi Watan Party

Sindh 

Jeay Sindh Muttahida Mahaz – nationalist, Liberal, liberation movement 
Sindhudesh Liberation Army – Militant, liberation movement

Palestinian Authority/occupied territories 

PLO
Fatah
Hamas
Islamic Jihad Movement

Sri Lanka 
Bodu Bala Sena
Patriotic People's Front (Sri Lanka)
Liberation Tigers of Tamil Eelam (Tamil Tigers) – independentist

Taiwan 
 Democratic Progressive Party - Progressive, Taiwanese nationalism
 New Power Party - Progressive, Taiwanese nationalism
 Taiwan Statebuilding Party - Progressive, Taiwanese nationalism
 Kuomintang - Conservative, Chinese nationalism
 New Party - Conservative, Chinese nationalism
 Labor Party - Left-wing, Chinese nationalism

Vietnam 

Vietminh – communist, nationalist
Vietcong – communist, nationalist
Viet Quoc - nationalist
Communist Party of Vietnam

The Americas

Brazil 

Brazilian Labour Renewal Party - far-right party with neofascist tendencies
Patriota - Christian ultranationalist party
Social Liberal Party - National conservative party
Carecas do ABC – neo-Nazi group
Alliance for Brazil - Right-wing populist party with a New nationalist ideology
Party of the Reconstruction of the National Order - Right-wing political party to the far right. Extinct in 2006

Canada

Canadian nationalism
Council of Canadians – progressive, anti-integration
Canadian Action Party
Confederation of Regions Party – ethnic nationalist, Far Right
Canada First – historic
The Waffle – (Defunct) radical faction of the New Democratic Party of Canada, later unsuccessful political party
Western Block Party

Quebec nationalism 

Alliance laurentienne
Bloc Québécois 
Parti indépendantiste
Republic of Quebec Party 
Parti Québécois 
Quebec Liberal Party – federalist (opposed to independence), cultural nationalist
Front de liberation du Quebec – independentist armed group
Mouvement national des Québécoises et Québécois 
Rally for National Independence 
SPQ Libre

United States 

American Freedom Party – American white nationalist
Constitution Party – Paleoconservative nationalist
Identity Evropa – Identitarian 
Ku Klux Klan - White supremacist
League of the South – Southern nationalism, separatist
New Black Panther Party – Black nationalist
Proud Boys - American civic nationalist

Oceania

Australia 

Pauline Hanson's One Nation – right-wing, anti-immigration, conservative, nationalist, populist
Pauline's United Australia Party – right-wing, nationalist, conservative, protectionist
Katter's Australian Party
United Patriots Front
Liberal Party of Australia
Australia First Party – ultranationalist and neo-Nazi, far-right
Antipodean Resistance – neo-Nazi group
National Action – ethnic nationalist, far-right
Fraser Anning's Conservative National Party - nationalist, conservative, anti-immigration
WAR - Warriors of the Aboriginal Resistance - Ethnic (Aboriginal) Nationalism, decolonisation

Fiji 

George Speight and other participants in the 2000 Fijian coup d'état

New Zealand 

New Zealand First – populist, conservative, nationalist
New Zealand National Front  – far-right ultranationalist

References

 
Nationalist